The Vitry-Le-François train bombing of 18 June 1961 was a bomb attack on a Strasbourg–Paris train carried out by the Organisation armée secrète (OAS), a far-right paramilitary organization opposed to the independence of Algeria in the Algerian War. With 28 fatalities and over 100 injured, it was the deadliest terrorist attack in modern French history until it was surpassed by the November 2015 Paris attacks and the 2016 Nice truck attack, which killed 130 and 86 people, respectively.

The bombing targeted the No. 12 express train, which derailed while traveling at high speed near the small village of Blacy, Marne between Vitry-le-François and Loisy-sur-Marne. On the day after the derailment, investigators found that the rails had been sabotaged using an explosive device that went off when the train passed over it. It also emerged that the stationmaster at Vitry-le-François had earlier received a threatening letter from the OAS.

The sabotage theory was ruled out despite a threat letter being received a few days earlier, prompting Communist Party leader Jacques Duclos to demand an inquiry on the matter. Despite this, the attack was kept secret by the French state.

See also
 List of right-wing terrorist attacks
 List of terrorist incidents in France

References 

Improvised explosive device bombings in France
Vitry-Le-Francois train bombing
Train bombings in Europe
Derailments in France
Mass murder in 1961
1961 murders in France
Organisation armée secrète
June 1961 events in Europe
Explosions in 1961
Right-wing terrorist incidents
Cover-ups